Many colleges and universities publish satirical journals, conventionally referred to as "humor magazines."

Among the most famous: The Harvard Lampoon, which gave rise to the National Lampoon in 1970, The Yale Record, the nation's oldest college humor magazine (founded in 1872), the Princeton Tiger Magazine which was founded in 1882, Pennsylvania Punch Bowl, founded in 1899, and Jester of Columbia, founded 1901.

List of college humor magazines
 American University: The Beagle
 Amherst College: The Amherst Muck-Rake
 Appalachian State University: The Rotten Appal
 Binghamton University: The Binghamton University Times-Tribune
 Boston College: The New England Classic
 Boston University: The Bunion
 Baylor University: The Rope
 Brandeis University: Gravity
 Brown University: The Brown Jug, The Philtrum Press, The Brown Noser
 Bowdoin College: The Harpoon
 Bucknell University: The Mucknellian
Caltech: The California Torch
 Cambridge University: The Porter's Log
 Case Western Reserve University: The Athenian
 Carleton College: The Salt
 Carnegie Mellon University: readme
 Claremont Colleges: The Golden Antlers
 Columbia University: Federalist Paper, Jester of Columbia
 Cornell University: Cornell Lunatic, CU Nooz
 Chapman University: The Kumquat
 Dalhousie University: The Dalhousie Mackerel
 Dartmouth College: Jack-O-Lantern
 Davidson College: The Yowl
 Denison University: The Bullsheet
 Duke University: The Duke Comical, The Fluke News
 Drake University: DUiN Magazine
 Emory University: The Spoke
 Fairleigh Dickinson University: The Nut FDU
 Florida Atlantic University: The Hoot
 Florida State University: The Eggplant
 Georgetown University: The Heckler
 Grinnell College: The B&S
 Gustavus Adolphus College: The Fourth Crown
 Harvard University: Demon, Lampoon and Satire V
 Hamilton College: Duel Observer
 Hofstra University: Nonsense
 Johns Hopkins University: The Hopkins Bubble, The Black and Blue Jay
 Kenyon College: The Kenyon Thrill and The Kenyon Collegiate
 Lehigh University: The Lehigh Lookaway
 Loyola Marymount University: The Bluff
 Macalester College: The Hegemonocle
 Marquette University: The Golden Seagull
 Massachusetts Institute of Technology: Voo Doo
 McGill University: The Plumber's Faucet
 New York University: PLAGUE
North Central College: The Kindling
 Northeastern University: Times New Roman
 Northwestern University: The Northwestern Flipside and Sherman Ave
 The Ohio State University: The Sundial
 Oxford University: The Oxymoron
 Pace University: The Pretentious Press
 Pennsylvania State University: Phroth
 Princeton University: The Tiger
 Queen's University: Golden Words
 Quinnipiac University: The Quinnipiac Barnacle
 Rice University: Backpage
 Rochester Institute of Technology: Gracies Dinnertime Theatre (defunct)
 Roosevelt University: RADMAG
 Rutgers University: The Medium
 Skidmore College: The Skidmo' Daily
 Southern Methodist University: The Boulevard Bulletin
 Stanford University: Chaparral
 Stanford University: Flipside
 Syracuse University: The Kumquat
 The Georgia Institute of Technology: Techsquare Times
 Tufts University: Zamboni
 Tulane University: The Tulane Vignette
 Texas A&M University: The Mugdown
 University of Alberta: The Guuber
 University of Arizona: The Pothole
 University College London: The Cheese Grater
 University of British Columbia: The Syrup Trap
 University of California, Berkeley: Heuristic Squelch
 University of California, Berkeley: The Free Peach
 University of California, Los Angeles: The Bruin Roast, The Westwood Enabler, and Satyr
 University of California, San Diego: The MQ and Koala
 University of California, Santa Barbara: Gaucho Marks Magazine and Nexustentialism (Daily Nexus)
 University of California, Santa Cruz: Fish Rap Live!
 University of Central Florida: The Stallion
 University of Chicago: The Shady Dealer
 University of Colorado, Boulder: Earth Muffins
 University of Denver: The Quackmire
 University of Florida: The Crocodile
 University of Georgia: The Hedge Trimmer
 University of Iowa: The Doily Allergen
 University of Illinois, Urbana-Champaign: The Deadbeat
 University of Kentucky: The Colonel
 University of Maryland, Baltimore County: MBC News
 University of Maryland, College Park: Cow Nipple and The Hare
 University of Michigan: Gargoyle and The Every Three Weekly
 University of Nebraska-Lincoln: The DailyER
 University of North Carolina at Chapel Hill: The Minor
 University of Oregon: Daily Jade
 University of Pennsylvania: The Pennsylvania Punch Bowl
 University of Pennsylvania: Under The Button
 University of Pittsburgh: The Pittiful News
 University of Southern California: The Sack of Troy
 University of St Andrews: The Mitre
 University of Texas: Travesty
 University of Texas at Arlington: The Catch
 University of Texas at Dallas: A Modest Proposal
 University of Toronto: The Toike Oike
 University of the Pacific: Pazifican
 University of Virginia: The Yellow Journal
 University of Warwick: The Hoar
 University of Washington: Off Leash News and The Fishwrapper
 University of Wisconsin–Madison: The Madison Misnomer
 Vanderbilt University: The Slant
 Washington and Lee University: The Radish
 Washington University in St. Louis: WUnderground
 Wesleyan University: Argus
 Wesleyan University: The Wesleyan Harold
 Western Kentucky University: The Big Red Tool
 William Jewell College: Paper
 Worcester Polytechnic Institute: The Institute
 Xavier University: The Bad Blob
 Yale University: Record

References

 
Student newspapers